Kurdistan Region–Syria relations are bilateral relations between Kurdistan Region and Syria. Kurdistan Region and Syria are neighbors, but Kurdistan Region only borders PYD-held Rojava since the Syrian civil war. Kurdistan Region and Syria share two border-crossings, and 208,574 Syrian refugees lived in Kurdistan Region in February 2021.

History
Due to the strained relations between Syria and Iraq under Hafez al-Assad and Saddam Hussein respectively, Assad supported Kurdish rebels in Northern Iraq as they fought Iraqi forces. In 1975, the Patriotic Union of Kurdistan was established in Damascus by Jalal Talabani and the Syrian regime established formal ties with Kurdistan Democratic Party in 1979, as Idris Barzani visited Damascus. Damascus tried to unite the various Iraqi Kurdish fractions against the Iraqi regime and offices for both parties were opened in Qamishli.

When the Syrian civil war reached the Kurdish areas of North Syria in 2012, President of Kurdistan Region Masoud Barzani gathered the various Kurdish factions of Syria in Erbil to unite them against Syrian President Bashar al-Assad. Many Syrian soldiers of Kurdish origin deserted at the early stages of the Syrian civil war and fled to Kurdistan Region to form "Rojava Peshmerga" which is funded by Kurdistan Region. Kurdish Foreign Minister Falah Mustafa Bakir stated that: "We want to a see a democratic and representative government in Damascus, and the opposition must take into consideration the recognition, rights and future of all the minority groups." In 2015, Syrian MP Sharif Shahada visited Erbil, where he mentioned that Barzani declined to visit Damascus back in 2011. Responding to the Kurdistan Region's independence referendum in September 2017, Syrian MP Riyaz Taus stated that Syria did not support the referendum, because it was a unilateral decision without Baghdad's consent. Advisor to the Council of Ministers Said Azzouz also echoed that any unilateral action will be rejected and that Syria cannot accept the division of Iraq. Furthermore, he stated that independence needed legal provisions from the Iraqi constitution.

In August 2017, Syrian Minister for Tourism Bishr Yaziji visited Erbil to strengthen tourism ties.

See also
Iraq–Syria relations
Kurdistan Region–Rojava relations
Kurdish National Council
Rabia, Iraq

References

Further reading

Syria
Bilateral relations of Syria